Tomislav Peykov Donchev (Bulgarian: Томислав Пейков Дончев) (born 6 August 1973 in Gabrovo, Bulgaria) is a Bulgarian GERB politician. Between 2007 and 2010 Donchev was mayor of Gabrovo, from March 2010 to March 2013 he was Minister without portfolio, responsible to administer the relief funds from the European Union in Borisov Government. From May 2013 Tomislav Donchev is MP in the National Assembly. From May 2014 Tomislav Donchev is Member of the European Parliament (MEP) in the European Parliament within the Group of the European People's Party (Christian Democrats).

References

External links 
 Official website

Living people
1973 births
People from Gabrovo
Mayors of places in Bulgaria
Members of the National Assembly (Bulgaria)
Government ministers of Bulgaria
MEPs for Bulgaria 2014–2019
GERB politicians
Bulgarian conservatives